Gary Sheehan (born December 23, 1968) is an American racing driver currently competing in the TCR International Series. Having previously competed in the Speed World Challenge, Grand-Am Cup, Global Time Attack & US Touring Car Championship, amongst others.

Racing career
Sheehan began his career in 1992 in the Jim Russell Racing School Formula 2000 Series, he raced there for many seasons up until 1994. In 1995 he switched to the Bridgestone Racing School Formula 2000 Championship, he raced there for four seasons and finished 2nd in the championship in 1997. He switched to the US Touring Car Championship for 2000, winning the championship title in his first season in the championship. He went on to finish 2nd in the standings in 2001, 2002 & 2003. In 2004 he switched to the Grand-Am Road Racing series, racing in both the GS and ST Classes. In 2005 he only raced in the ST Class. For 2006 he switched to the Speed World Challenge, only racing a single weekend in the championship. Between 2007 & 2012 he raced in the Global Time Attack series and the 25 Hours of Thunderhill. In 2014 he returned to the US Touring Car Championship in a Hyundai Genesis Coupe 3.8L, winning the championship that year, as well as 2018, 2019, 2020, and 2021.

In June 2016 it was announced that he would race in the TCR International Series, driving a Volkswagen Golf GTI TCR for Liqui Moly Team Engstler.

Racing record

Complete TCR International Series results
(key) (Races in bold indicate pole position) (Races in italics indicate fastest lap)

† Driver did not finish the race, but was classified as he completed over 90% of the race distance.

Complete USTCC Series results
(key) (Races in bold indicate pole position) (Races in italics indicate fastest lap)

† Driver did not finish the race, but was classified as he completed over 90% of the race distance.

References

External links
 
 
 

1968 births
Living people
TCR International Series drivers
American racing drivers
Engstler Motorsport drivers
Racing drivers from New York (state)
Racing drivers from New York City
Sportspeople from New York City